Splendrillia campbellensis is a species of sea snail, a marine gastropod mollusk in the family Drilliidae.

The species was named after the Campell Plateau were the holotype was found.

Description
The length of the shell attains 14.6 mm, its diameter 5 mm.

Distribution
S. campbellensis can be found in the waters surrounding the Antipodes Islands, New Zealand. at a depth of about 1,000 m.

References

  Tucker, J.K. 2004 Catalog of recent and fossil turrids (Mollusca: Gastropoda). Zootaxa 682:1–1295.

External links

 campbellensis
Gastropods of New Zealand
Gastropods described in 1989